The H.B. Hays and Brothers Coal Railroad was a narrow gauge railroad opened in 1878 to carry coal from the Hays family mines along Becks Run and Streets Run in Allegheny County, Pennsylvania.  Both branches included an incline, and both are visible in the engravings below, one just south of Six Mile Ferry, the other in the hills south of the mouth of Becks Run.  The mines, railroads, and inclines were designed by Pittsburgh engineer John H. McRoberts.

See also 
 Henry Blake Hays
 List of funicular railways
 List of inclines in Pittsburgh

References

External links 
 1876 Map of the Railroad

Defunct companies based in Allegheny County, Pennsylvania
Defunct funicular railways in the United States
Defunct Pennsylvania railroads
History of Allegheny County, Pennsylvania
History of Pittsburgh
Narrow gauge railroads in Pennsylvania
Railway inclines in Pittsburgh
Transportation in Pittsburgh
Railway companies established in 1878
1878 establishments in Pennsylvania
American companies established in 1878